Coonipper Creek is a stream in the U.S. state of Mississippi.

Coonipper is a name derived from the Choctaw language purported to refer to the "name of a weed which grows in low grounds". A variant name is "Coonupy Creek".

References

Rivers of Mississippi
Rivers of Clarke County, Mississippi
Mississippi placenames of Native American origin